The Ministry of Archers is the tenth studio album by American Christian synthpop band Joy Electric. It was released on compact disc by Tooth & Nail Records on August 30, 2005. A 12" colored vinyl version was co-released through Republic of Texas Recordings and Somewherecold Records in October 2005, which includes two bonus tracks. The album is the fourth release in the five-part "Legacy" series. The Moog Voyager synthesizer was used for the creation of all sounds.

Track listing

References

2005 albums
Joy Electric albums
Somewherecold Records albums
Tooth & Nail Records albums